Ankersen is a Danish surname. Notable people with the surname include:

 Jakob Ankersen (born 1990), Danish footballer
 Peter Ankersen (born 1990), Danish footballer
 Rasmus Ankersen (born 1983), Danish author

See also
 Andersen

Danish-language surnames